David Earl Lumley (born September 1, 1954) is a Canadian former professional ice hockey player. Lumley was selected in both the twelfth round of the 1974 NHL amateur draft (199th overall) by the Montreal Canadiens and in the eighth round of the 1974 WHA Amateur Draft (108th overall), by the Vancouver Blazers.  Electing to pursue an NHL career, Lumley eventually played parts of nine seasons with the Canadiens, Edmonton Oilers and Hartford Whalers, winning the Stanley Cup on two occasions 1984 and 1985 with the Edmonton Oilers.

Early life
Lumley's formative hockey skills were developed playing in the West Hill Minor and the Scarborough Hockey Associations. As a youth, he played in the 1967 Quebec International Pee-Wee Hockey Tournament with the Toronto Shopsy's minor ice hockey team. He attended high school at Sir Wilfrid Laurier Collegiate Institute and lived in Guildwood Village from 1968 to 1973.

Amateur career
After a single season in the Ontario Hockey Association's Junior A Richmond Hill Rams, Lumley decided to pursue the game by going to the University of New Hampshire Wildcats, who competed in the ECAC.  At the time, this was viewed as an unconventional route, as most prospective NHL'ers spent their amateur career in the Canadian Hockey League.  Lumley also played lacrosse at the University of New Hampshire.  He was a 12th round selection in the 1974 Amateur Draft, and instead of turning professional right away he completed his college eligibility playing for the Wildcats, putting up 170 points in just 126 games.

Professional career
Lumley joined the Montreal Canadiens organization, and spent the majority of his first two seasons with their American Hockey League affiliate, the Nova Scotia Voyageurs.  His play improved dramatically in his second season, where he was named a second-team all-star and was rewarded with a three-game call-up with the Canadiens.  On June 13, 1979, Montreal traded Lumley and Dan Newman to the Edmonton Oilers in exchange for a second round pick, which was used on future NHL'er Ric Nattress.

The following season (1979–80) Lumley made the Oilers out of training camp and posted solid totals in both points and penalty minutes in his official rookie season.  Lumley would spend a total of five seasons, including a Stanley Cup win, before being claimed off waivers by the Hartford Whalers.  Lumley's time in Hartford was limited however, as after 48 games the Whalers put him on waivers, where he was reclaimed by the Edmonton Oilers, allowing him to be a part of their second Cup-winning team.  Lumley played a limited role on the 1985–86 team, and just one game into the 1986–87 NHL season, he announced his retirement.

Awards
American Hockey League Second All-Star Team (1979)
Stanley Cup champions (1984, 1985)

Career statistics

Regular season and playoffs

References

External links
 

1954 births
Living people
Edmonton Oilers players
Hartford Whalers players
Montreal Canadiens draft picks
Montreal Canadiens players
New Hampshire Wildcats men's ice hockey players
Nova Scotia Voyageurs players
Ice hockey people from Toronto
Stanley Cup champions
Vancouver Blazers draft picks
Canadian ice hockey right wingers